Vitus Pichler (born at Großberghofen, 24 May 1670; died at Munich, 15 February 1736) was an Austrian Jesuit canonist and controversial writer.

He studied for the secular priesthood, but after ordination entered the Society of Jesus, 28 September 1696. For four years he was professor of philosophy at Briggs and Dillingen. He was then advanced to the chair of philosophy, controversial and scholastic, at Augsburg. He acquired fame in the field of canon law, which he taught for nineteen years at Dillingen, and at Ingolstadt, where he was the successor of Francis Xavier Schmalzgrueber. His last appointment was as prefect of higher studies at Munich.

Works

His first important literary works were "Lutheranismus constanter errans" (1709); "Una et vera fides" (1710); and "Theologia polemica particularis" (1711). In his "Cursus theologiæ polemicæ universæ" (1713), Pichler devotes the first part to the fundamentals of polemical theology and the second part to the particular errors of the reformers. It is said that he is the first writer to lay down, clearly and separately, the distinction between fundamental theology and other divisions of the science.

He also wrote an important work on papal infallibility, "Papatus nunquan errans in proponendis fidei articulis" (1709). Although renowned as a polemical theologian, Pichler is better known as a canonist. He published his "Candidatus juris prudentiæ sacræ" in 1722; this was followed by "Summa jurisprudentiæ sacræ universæ" in 1723 sqq. He also issued "Manipulus casuum juridicorum" and several epitomes of his larger canonical treatises.

Pichler's controversial works were in great vogue during the eighteenth century, while his books on canon law were used as textbooks in many universities. His solutions to difficult cases in jurisprudence gave a decided impetus to the study of the canons and afforded a key to the intricate portions of the "Corpus juris canonici". Fourteen of Pichler's works, excluding the many editions and alterations, are enumerated.

Notes

References
Attribution
  Cites as sources:
Hugo von Hurter, Nomenclator literarius, III (Innsbruck, 1895)
Carlos Sommervogel, Bibliothèque de la Compagnie de Jésus, VI (Brussels, 1895)
Augustin de Backer, Bibliothèque des éscrevains S. J. (Liège, 1853-76).

1670 births
1736 deaths
17th-century Austrian Jesuits
Canon law jurists
Austrian male writers
Academic staff of the University of Dillingen
Academic staff of the Ludwig Maximilian University of Munich
Academic staff of the University of Ingolstadt
18th-century jurists
18th-century Austrian Jesuits